Gilson Benchimol Tavares (born 29 December 2001), or simply Benchimol, is a Cape Verdean professional footballer who plays as a forward for Portuguese side Benfica B, on loan from Estoril, and the Cape Verde national team.

International career
Tavares debuted for the Cape Verde national team in a 2–1 friendly loss to Guinea on 10 October 2020. He scored a hat-trick in a game against the Liechtenstein national football team on 25 March 2022.
He was named in the roster for the 2021 Africa cup of nations  when the team reached the round of 16..

References

External links
Fora de Jogo Profile

2001 births
Living people
Cape Verdean footballers
Cape Verde international footballers
Association football forwards
G.D. Estoril Praia players
S.L. Benfica B players
Liga Portugal 2 players
Cape Verdean expatriate footballers
Cape Verdean expatriates in Portugal
Expatriate footballers in Portugal
Cape Verdean people of Jewish descent
People of Sephardic-Jewish descent
2021 Africa Cup of Nations players